The Grays Harbor Transportation Authority, doing business as Grays Harbor Transit (and abbreviated as GH Transit), is a public transit agency serving Grays Harbor County in the U.S. state of Washington. It operates ten fixed bus routes traveling through the county's major cities and connecting to Olympia in Thurston County and Centralia in Lewis County, as well as paratransit service, dial-a-ride routes and a vanpool fleet. The agency, one of the first county transit authorities to be established in Washington state, began operations on June 16, 1975, and is one of few in the state that are not governed as a public transportation benefit area.

Routes
, Grays Harbor Transit operates 10 fixed routes and 4 dial-a-ride routes. Fixed route buses run seven days a week; with the exception of route 57 (Tues/Thurs only); route 90 (Mon/Fri only); and route 60 (no Sunday service). Dial-a-ride routes operate only on weekdays, and service is suspended on national holidays.

Route 10N: Fern Hill, Bench Drive, Walmart
Route 10S: South Aberdeen, Grays Harbor College, South Shore Mall
Route 30: Cosmopolis
Route 20: Aberdeen, Hoquiam, N&W Hoquiam, Community Hospital, Woodlawn
Route 40: Hoquiam, Aberdeen, Hoquiam, Central Park, Montesano, Satsop, Elma, McCleary, Olympia
Connections to Intercity Transit, Mason Transit Authority, and Sound Transit Express (via Intercity Transit route 620 to Lakewood)
Route 41: Montesano Dial-a-Ride and Central Park
Route 42: Elma Dial-a-Ride
Route 60: Ocean Shores, Ocean City, Copalis Beach, Copalis Crossing, Pacific Beach, Moclips, Taholah 
Route 51: Ocean Shores Dial-a-Ride
Route 70: Westport-Grayland
Route 56: Westport Route Deviation and Dial-a-Ride
Route 57: Raymond/Tokeland
Route 50: Quinault, Amanda Park, Neilton, Humptulips
Connections to Jefferson Transit
Route 90: Oakville, Centralia
Connections to Twin Transit

References

External links

Bus transportation in Washington (state)
Transit agencies in Washington (state)
Transportation in Grays Harbor County, Washington
1975 establishments in Washington (state)